Conrad II of Luxembourg (died 1136) was count of Luxembourg (1131–1136), in succession to his father William, Count of Luxembourg.  His mother was Mathilde or Luitgarde of Northeim.

He married Ermengarde, daughter of count Otto II, Count of Zutphen. Conrad II died without a male heir, and so the county of Luxembourg reverted to the Holy Roman Emperor.  The emperor in turn did not wish the county to be ruled by Conrad's closest relative Henri de Grandpré, who was a French lord and so might align the county with the kingdom of France, and so granted it to Henry of Namur, a cousin of Conrad's.

1136 deaths
Counts of Luxembourg
Year of birth unknown
House of Luxembourg